Rondon's Tuco-tuco, Ctenomys rondoni, is a tuco-tuco species from South America. It is found in Mato Grosso, Brazil.

Tuco-tucos